The Central American Race Walking Championships (Spanish: Campeonato Centroamericano de Marcha) is an annual race walking competition organized by CADICA for athletes representing the countries of its member associations. The event was established in 2007 as Central American Race Walking Cup (Spanish: Copa Centroamericana de Marcha). The name was changed in 2012.  Races are featured for senior (Spanish: Mayor), junior (U-20, Spanish: Juvenil A), youth (U-18, Spanish: Juvenil B), and two age groups (U-16, (Spanish: Juvenil C), and U-14, (Spanish: Infantil A)) for both male and female athletes.  In addition, there are separate team competitions.

Editions

Central American Race Walking Cup

Central American Race Walking Championships

Results 
Complete result list were published on the CADICA website.  Results
for the junior and youth competitions can be found on the World Junior
Athletics History ("WJAH") webpage.

Men's results

Senior

20 kilometres

35 kilometres

Junior U-20 (Juvenil A)

10 kilometres 

†: In 2013, some non-CADICA race walkers were invited to start out of competition. Luis Miguel Colón from  finished 2nd in 53:53, Jan Carlos Figueroa also from  finished 3rd in 55:53.

Youth U-18 (Juvenil B)

10 kilometres

U-16 (Juvenil C)

5 kilometres

U-14 (Infantil A)

3 kilometres

Women's results

Senior

10 kilometres 

†: In 2012, Wilane Cuevas from  started out of competition and finished 1st in 57:09.

20 kilometres 

She finished in 2:01:36.

Junior U-20 (Juvenil A)

10 kilometres 

competition and finished 2nd in 56:42.

Youth U-18 (Juvenil B)

5 kilometres

U-16 (Juvenil C)

4 kilometres

5 kilometres

U-14 (Infantil A)

2 kilometres

See also
IAAF World Race Walking Cup
European Race Walking Cup
Pan American Race Walking Cup
South American Race Walking Championships
Asian Race Walking Championships
Oceania Race Walking Championships

References

External links
CADICA
World Junior Athletics History

CADICA competitions
Racewalking competitions
Recurring sporting events established in 2007